This is a list of urban areas in Norway by population, with population numbers as of 1 January 2017. For a list of towns and cities in Norway, see this link.

Statistics Norway, the governmental organisation with the task of measuring the Norwegian population, uses the term tettsted (literally "dense place"; meaning urban settlement or urban area), which is defined as a continuous built-up area with a maximum distance of 50 metres between residences unless a greater distance is caused by public areas, cemeteries or similar reasons. The continuously built-up areas in Norway (urban areas) with the highest population are:

See also
List of municipalities of Norway
Metropolitan regions of Norway
List of urban areas in Sweden by population
List of urban areas in Denmark by population
List of urban areas in the Nordic countries
List of urban areas in Finland by population
List of cities and towns in Iceland
Largest metropolitan areas in the Nordic countries
List of metropolitan areas in Sweden

References and notes

Norway
Norway
Urban areas
Norway